Ollur railway station (station code: OLR) falls between Thrissur railway station and Pudukad railway station in the busy Shoranur–Cochin Harbour section of Trivandrum railway division.

Administration 
Ollur railway station is operated by the Chennai-headquartered Southern Railway zone of the Indian Railways.

History
Ollur railway station traces its history to 1902, when Shoranur–Cochin railway line was built during the rule of Rama Varma XV of Cochin Royal Family. Britishers bought the land and the house of Moyalan Varghees for Rs.50 to construct the Ollur railway station.

Passenger trains from Ollur railway station

References

Thiruvananthapuram railway division
Railway stations in Thrissur
Railway stations opened in 1902